Zgornja Besnica is a village in the Municipality of Kranj in the Upper Carniola region of Slovenia.

Geography
Zgornja Besnica is a scattered village on partially wooded terraced terrain below the eastern slope of Rovnik Hill. It includes the hamlets of Brše, Čepulje, Dvor, Klinar, Nova Vas, Podrovnik, and Videm. It is connected by road to Kranj to the southeast and Nemilje to the west. The Lucenk Woods stands south of the village, and there is a trail to the north to Šum Falls on Nemiljščica Creek, located just beyond the village's territory in Poljšica pri Podnartu. Other caves in the area include Brjevšca Cave, Grlovec Cave, and Podskokar Cave.

Name
The name Zgornja Besnica means 'upper Besnica', contrasting with Spodnja Besnica 'lower Besnica', which lies  lower in elevation. The two villages were attested in historical documents as Vessnitz in 1421, referring to the stream of the same name. The name Besnica is originally a hydronym that was later applied to the settlement along Besnica Creek, a tributary of the Sava. The name is derived from the Slavic adjective *běsьnъ 'rushing, swift', referring the character of the stream.

Church
The parish church in the settlement is dedicated to Saint Giles.

References

External links

Zgornja Besnica on Geopedia

Populated places in the City Municipality of Kranj